Miroslav Stojanović (Serbian Cyrillic: Мирослав Стојановић; born 21 November 1939), is a Serbian sport shooter who competed for Yugoslavia at the 1960 Olympic Games.

References

External links
ISSF profile

1939 births
Living people
Serbian male sport shooters
Yugoslav male sport shooters
Shooters at the 1960 Summer Olympics
Olympic shooters of Yugoslavia
Sportspeople from Niš